Bojong Gede (also can be spelled as Bojonggede) is a district (Indonesian: Kecamatan) in the Bogor Regency, West Java, Indonesia. It is a suburb to Jakarta, and can also be considered as part of its metropolitan region, Greater Jakarta. 

Thanks to its location being a suburb, Bojong Gede is a rather urbanized district, which also makes it densely populated. Like its other neighbouring districts, it is one of the districts in the regency, that lies in between the city of Depok, and Bogor, both also part of Jakarta Raya. This attracts a rather large residential population for the people who would commute to the cities.

This district is served by Bojong Gede railway station and Citayam railway station (located in Depok, near Pabuaran).

Kelurahan dan Desa (Urban Village and Rural Villages)
The district of Bojong Gede is divided into 1 urban village (kelurahan) and 8 rural villages (desa).
Urban village:
Pabuaran

Rural villages:
Cimanggis
Waringin Jaya
Kedung Waringin
Bojong Gede
Susukan
Bojong Baru
Rawa Panjang
Ragajaya

References

External links
 
 Berita tentang Desa Susukan Kecamatan Bojonggede

Districts of Bogor Regency